Mohamed Zekri (born May 10, 1985) was an Egyptian football striker. He is the tallest player in the Egyptian Premier League.

Mohamed is the twin brother of defender Karim Zekri, but he is a bit physically larger.

References

1985 births
Living people
Egyptian footballers
Egyptian twins
Twin sportspeople
Sportspeople from Port Said
Al Masry SC players
Tersana SC players
Association football forwards